Eric Noren (born November 8, 1977) is an American director of films, commercials and music videos. Born in Arcadia, California, he is a grandson of former American professional baseball and basketball player Irv Noren. He received a BA in Film and Digital Media from UC Santa Cruz in 2000 and currently lives in Oakland.

Noren has been most prolific in the genre of skateboarding and commercial advertising. His skateboarding films include Stereo Sound Agency's Way Out East and Krux's Feelin’ It. Auteur in his approach, he is engaged in all aspects of production including concept development, writing, directing, filming and editing. In 2006, Noren collaborated with visual artist Jeremy Fish and rap artist Aesop Rock on the short film Fish Tales. In 2014, Noren co-directed and produced a feature-length concert film for the band Midlake with Jason Lee (actor). The film titled Midlake: Live in Denton, TX, premiered in England at the Glastonbury Festival.

References

Living people
1977 births